Parvathy Soman (born 22 April 1997) is an Indian singer. She is best known as a playback singer in Malayalam films. She sings in Malayalam devotional album songs. Parvathy's career began when she won the Munch Star Singer Junior contest.

Biography
Parvathy was born on 22 April 1997 to a Malayali Hindu family in Ernakulam, Kerala. She grew up in Edappally, a town near Ernakulam. Her father, Mr. Somashekharan Nair, works as an Income tax officer and her mother, Anitha Soman, is a home maker. Parvathy was trained in classical music in Ernakulam with Chandramana Narayanan Namboothiri. As a child, she won the children's special reality show Super Star Junior 2 contest on the Amrita Television channel.

She has sung in many Malayalam films. Some of them are Palunku, Oruvan, Colours, Kerala Cafe, and finally she sang a song "Swapnam.." in the Malayalam film Track, that was released in May 2012.

References

Indian women playback singers
Women musicians from Kerala
1997 births
Living people
Singers from Kochi
Malayalam playback singers
Film musicians from Kerala
21st-century Indian singers
21st-century Indian women singers